The 2018 CAF Confederation Cup qualifying rounds were played from 9 February to 18 April 2018. A total of 70 teams competed in the qualifying rounds to decide the 16 places in the group stage of the 2018 CAF Confederation Cup.

Draw

The draw for the preliminary round and first round was held on 13 December 2017 at the CAF headquarters in Cairo, Egypt.

The entry round of the 54 teams entered into the draw is determined by their performances in the CAF competitions for the previous five seasons (CAF 5-Year Ranking points shown in parentheses).

Format

In the qualifying rounds, each tie was played on a home-and-away two-legged basis. If the aggregate score was tied after the second leg, the away goals rule would be applied, and if still tied, extra time would not be played, and the penalty shoot-out would be used to determine the winner (Regulations III. 13 & 14).

Schedule
The schedule of each round was as follows (matches scheduled in midweek in italics).

Bracket
The bracket of the draw was announced by the CAF on 13 December 2017.

The 16 winners of the first round advanced to the play-off round, where they were joined by the 16 losers of the Champions League first round.

Preliminary round
The preliminary round included the 44 teams that did not receive byes to the first round.

|}

Petro de Luanda won 5–0 on aggregate.

Cape Town City won 2–0 on aggregate.

Costa do Sol won 2–0 on aggregate.

Energie won 2–1 on aggregate.

APR won 6–1 on aggregate.

Djoliba won on walkover after ELWA United withdrew.

1–1 on aggregate. Fosa Juniors won on away goals.

AS Port-Louis 2000 won 5–2 on aggregate.

AS Maniema Union won 2–1 on aggregate.

Olympique Star won 1–0 on aggregate.

2–2 on aggregate. Deportivo Niefang won on away goals.

CS La Mancha won 1–0 on aggregate.

Akwa United won 3–2 on aggregate.

Al-Ittihad Tripoli won 4–0 on aggregate.

US Ben Guerdane won on walkover after Al-Hilal Juba failed to arrive for the first leg.

1–1 on aggregate. CARA Brazzaville won 7–6 on penalties.

CR Belouizdad won 3–1 on aggregate.

Al-Masry won 5–2 on aggregate.

Simba won 5–0 on aggregate.

RS Berkane won 3–2 on aggregate.

FC Nouadhibou won 2–1 on aggregate.

Welayta Dicha won 2–1 on aggregate.

First round
The first round included 32 teams: the 22 winners of the preliminary round, and the 10 teams that received byes to this round.

|}

SuperSport United won 2–1 on aggregate.

2–2 on aggregate. Costa do Sol won on away goals.

Enyimba won 5–2 on aggregate.

2–2 on aggregate. Djoliba won on away goals.

Fosa Juniors won 3–0 on aggregate.

3–3 on aggregate. USM Alger won on away goals.

Al-Hilal Al-Ubayyid won 6–0 on aggregate.

Deportivo Niefang won 2–1 on aggregate.

CS La Mancha won 4–2 on aggregate.

1–1 on aggregate. Akwa United won 3–2 on penalties.

CARA Brazzaville won 4–3 on aggregate.

CR Belouizdad won 3–1 on aggregate.

2–2 on aggregate. Al-Masry won on away goals.

RS Berkane won 4–1 on aggregate.

Raja Casablanca won 5–3 on aggregate.

3–3 on aggregate. Welayta Dicha won 4–3 on penalties.

Play-off round
The play-off round included 32 teams: the 16 winners of the Confederation Cup first round and the 16 losers of the Champions League first round.

The draw for the play-off round was held on 21 March 2018, 19:00 EET (UTC+2), at the Ritz Carlton in Cairo, Egypt. The winners of the Confederation Cup first round were drawn against the losers of the Champions League first round, with the teams from the Confederation Cup hosting the second leg.The 32 teams were seeded by their performances in the CAF competitions for the previous five seasons (CAF 5-Year Ranking points shown in parentheses):
Pot A contained the four highest-ranked losers of the Champions League first round.
Pot B contained the four highest-ranked winners of the Confederation Cup first round.
Pot C contained the twelve lowest-ranked losers of the Champions League first round.
Pot D contained the twelve lowest-ranked winners of the Confederation Cup first round.

First, a team from Pot A and a team from Pot D were drawn into four ties. Next, a team from Pot B and a team from Pot C were drawn into four ties. Finally, the remaining teams from Pot C and Pot D were drawn into the last eight ties.

The 16 winners of the play-off round advanced to the group stage.

|}

Raja Casablanca won 5–0 on aggregate.

AS Vita Club won 6–1 on aggregate.

1–1 on aggregate. CARA Brazzaville won 4–3 on penalties.

3–3 on aggregate. Al-Hilal won on away goals.

2–2 on aggregate. Gor Mahia won on away goals.

UD Songo won 4–3 on aggregate.

USM Alger won 5–2 on aggregate.

1–1 on aggregate. Enyimba won on away goals.

Aduana Stars won 7–3 on aggregate.

Young Africans won 2–1 on aggregate.

3–3 on aggregate. RS Berkane won on away goals.

Al-Masry won 3–2 on aggregate.

ASEC Mimosas won 1–0 on aggregate.

Williamsville AC won 3–2 on aggregate.

Djoliba won 1–0 on aggregate.

Rayon Sports won 3–2 on aggregate.

Notes

References

External links
Total CAF Confederation Cup 2018, CAFonline.com

1
February 2018 sports events in Africa
March 2018 sports events in Africa
April 2018 sports events in Africa